Henry Melville was an Australian writer.

Henry Melville may also refer to:

Henry Melvill (1798–1871), priest
Henry Melville (journalist), coined the term Black War
Henry, Viscount Melville
Henry William Melville (1792–1870), engraver and father of Harden Sidney Melville

See also
Henry Melville Whitney (1839–1923), American industrialist
Harry Melville (disambiguation)